Anveh (also known as Naveh and Sheykh ‘Alī) is a village in Fatuyeh Rural District, in the Central District of Bastak County, Hormozgan Province, Iran. At the 2006 census, its population was 1,050, in 197 families.

References 

Populated places in Bastak County